Yassin Ben Balla (born 24 February 1996) is a French professional footballer who plays as a midfielder for German  club Darmstadt 98.

Career
Ben Balla moved to MSV Duisburg on 19 June 2019. He made his professional debut for MSV Duisburg in the 3. Liga on 20 July 2019, starting in the home match against Sonnenhof Großaspach.

He moved to Eintracht Braunschweig for the 2020–21 season.

On 2 July 2022, Ben Balla signed a one-year contract with Darmstadt 98.

Personal life
Born in France, Ben Balla is of Moroccan descent.

Career statistics

References

External links

Profile at kicker.de

1996 births
Living people
Sportspeople from Valenciennes
French footballers
French sportspeople of Moroccan descent
French expatriate footballers
French expatriate sportspeople in Switzerland
Expatriate footballers in Switzerland
French expatriate sportspeople in Germany
Expatriate footballers in Germany
Association football midfielders
Amiens SC players
FC Zürich players
Rot-Weiß Oberhausen players
MSV Duisburg players
Eintracht Braunschweig players
FC Ingolstadt 04 players
SV Darmstadt 98 players
Championnat National 3 players
Swiss Promotion League players
2. Bundesliga players
3. Liga players
Regionalliga players
Footballers from Hauts-de-France